Léon De Coster (born 26 April 1893, date of death unknown) was a Belgian sports shooter. He competed in the 30m team military pistol event at the 1920 Summer Olympics.

References

External links
 

1893 births
Year of death missing
Belgian male sport shooters
Olympic shooters of Belgium
Shooters at the 1920 Summer Olympics
Place of birth missing